A list of films produced in Argentina in 1986:

1986

External links and references
 Argentine films of 1986 at the Internet Movie Database

1986
Argentine
Films